Bhagavad Gita (known as Bhagvad Gita: Song of the Lord in the United States) is a 1993 Indian Sanskrit-language drama film with few dialogues in Hindi and Telugu language. It was produced by T. Subbarami Reddy and directed by G. V. Iyer. The film is based on Hindu religious book Bhagavad Gita, which is part of the epic Mahabharata.

Plot

G. V. Iyer's film opens with a flowery pooja performed on a shivalinga, followed by an on-stage presentation of the film's cast and crew. The mayhem of the Kurukshetra War is witnessed by Prince Arjuna before he and his charioteer, Krishna, begin the dialogue that is the Bhagavad Gita. Complimentary imagery accompany the verses of the Gita, with many of the scenes set in nature, eventually crescendoing with Arjuna standing atop clouds among the Himalayas, transitioning further up into the cosmos as imagery of the planets accompany verses sung by Krishna.

Reception

The film premiered at the Andhra Pradesh Film Chamber of Commerce in Hyderabad, India, and International Film Festival of India. The film went on to win the National Film Award for Best Feature Film at the 40th National Film Awards in 1993.

See also
G. V. Iyer
Adi Shankaracharya (film)

References

External links

1993 films
Films based on the Mahabharata
Best Feature Film National Film Award winners
Bhagavad Gita
Sanskrit-language films
Films directed by G. V. Iyer
Films scored by M. Balamuralikrishna